Cen or CEN may refer to:

People and language
 Cen language
 Cen (rune) (ᚳ), a rune of the Anglo-Saxon fuþorc
 Cen (surname) (岑), a Chinese second name

Acronym
 Certified Emergency Nurse
 Childhood emotional neglect
 Cambridge Evening News, former name for the Cambridge News
 Center for Electron Nanoscopy, an institute at the Technical University of Denmark (DTU)
 Central European News, a news distributor
 European Committee for Standardization (Comité Européen de Normalisation)
 SCK•CEN, Belgian nuclear research institute (Centre d'Étude de l'énergie Nucléaire)

Abbreviation or code
 Centaurus, the constellation
 Centaur (minor planet)
 Centralia, Illinois (Amtrak station)
 Central Region, Scotland, Chapman code
 Central station (MTR), Hong Kong
 Ciudad Obregón International Airport (IATA code: CEN) in Ciudad Obregón, Sonora, Mexico

See also